The Wallaby Club is a private walking club in Melbourne, Victoria (Australia), which was established in 1894. The club is based on good fellowship, talking and an appreciation of both the natural and built environments. Membership is by invitation only and strictly limited. The Club motto is À Votre Santé [to your health].

Origin

The Wallaby Club was the idea of a Melbourne physician, Dr Louis Henry, who intended it to embody the Johnsonian definition of an assembly of good fellows, meeting under certain conditions. The club members include, professionals, artists, teachers, musicians, writers. The focus on walking was not for athleticism, which was anathema to the founder,  ...but as a means to outdoor enjoyment, conducive to health, conversation and good companionship.

The Wallaby Club is considered among the first true walking clubs in Australia. The club keeps a ceremonial walking stick known as the ANZAC stick and believed to have been brought back from Gallipoli. It is used as the Presidential mace, with bands for each of the presidents (now completely covering the stick).

Notable members

Ian Clunies Ross
Owen Dixon
Andrew Fisher
Edmund Gill
Brian Harper 
Herbert Reah Harper
William Charles Kernot
John Monash

References

External links

1894 establishments in Australia
Organizations established in 1894
Organisations based in Melbourne
Gentlemen's clubs in Australia
Clubs and societies in Victoria (Australia)